4BU is an Australian radio station serving the Bundaberg region in Queensland, Australia. It was opened in December 1935.

4BU is a classic hits station playing hit songs from the 1960s right through to the mid-2000s. Owned by ARN, 4BU places strong emphasis on local programming, with its entire daytime lineup broadcast from its Maryborough St studios.

4BU also takes talk programming from 2UE overnight.

In November 2021, 4BU, along with other stations owned by Grant Broadcasters, were acquired by the Australian Radio Network. This deal allows Grant's stations, including 4BU, to access ARN's iHeartRadio platform in regional areas. The deal was finalized on January 4, 2022. It is expected 4BU will integrate with ARN's Pure Gold Network, but will retain its current name according to the press release from ARN.

On-air line up
 Weekdays
5am - 10am:  Daniel Brewer
10am - 12pm: Music
12pm - 1pm: The 80's Lunch
1pm - 5pm: Trevor Leutton
5pm - 6pm: The Christian O'Connell Show
6pm - 7am: JAM Nation
7pm - 9pm: The 20/20 Retro Countdown

Heritage listing 
The 4BU Radio Station building at 55 Woongarra Street was built by the station in 1957 and occupied until 1992 when the station relocated to larger premises. The building was listed on the Queensland Heritage Register in 2000.

References

External links

Radio stations in Queensland
Radio stations established in 1935
Classic hits radio stations in Australia
Australian Radio Network